Medebach is a town in the Hochsauerland district, in North Rhine-Westphalia, Germany.

Geography

Neighbouring municipalities

 Korbach
 Lichtenfels
 Willingen
 Winterberg

Division of the town 
Besides, the town center of Medebach, the municipality consists of the following districts, formerly independent villages:

  with Roninghausen
  with Wissinghausen

International relations

Medebach is twinned with
  Locminé (France)
  Worbis (Germany)

History
The town was first mentioned in a document in 1144. It belonged to the Hanseatic League.

Medebach and its district Oberschledorn entered the international news in September 2007 during the 2007 bomb plot in Germany, when three Islamic terrorists, two Germans and a Turk, were arrested there. They had received training in Pakistan and were about to build bombs from hydrogen peroxide in a rented holiday flat.

Notable inhabitants
Henricus de Medebeke, 1347 mayor of Reval
Caspar Vopelius, cartographer, mathematician, astronomer
Wilhelm Hohoff (1848-1923), Catholic priest
Hermann Bergenthal, painter, Oberschledorn
Josef Bergenthal, writer (1900-1982), („Münster steckt voller Merkwürdigkeiten“, 1935), Oberschledorn
 Thomas Seeliger (born 1966), football player

References

External links

 Official Medebach website—
 Touristic information 

Hochsauerlandkreis